Richard Norman Shaw RA (7 May 1831 – 17 November 1912), also known as Norman Shaw, was a British architect who worked from the 1870s to the 1900s, known for his country houses and for commercial buildings. He is considered to be among the greatest of British architects; his  influence on architectural style was strongest in the 1880s and 1890s.

Early life and education
Shaw was born 7 May 1831 in Edinburgh, the sixth and last child of William Shaw (1780–1833), an Irish Protestant and army officer, and Elizabeth née Brown (1785–1883), from a family of successful Edinburgh lawyers. William Shaw died 2 years after his son's birth, leaving debts. Two of Shaw's siblings died young and a third in early adulthood. The family lived first in Annandale Street and then Haddington Place. Richard was educated at an academy for languages, located at 3 and 5 Hill Street Edinburgh until c.1842, then had one year of formal schooling in Newcastle, followed by being taught by his sister Janet. The eldest surviving child Robert had moved to London to work; the rest of the family followed about 1846, living in Middleton Road, Dalston. Richard began his apprenticeship almost immediately at an unknown architect's practice. By 1849, he had transferred to the London office of sixty-year-old William Burn,  at whose practice Shaw remained for five years. He attended the evening lectures on architecture given at the Royal Academy of Arts by Charles Robert Cockerell.  He met William Eden Nesfield at the Royal Academy, with whom he briefly partnered in some architectural designs. During 1854–1856, Shaw travelled with a Royal Academy scholarship, collecting sketches that were published as Architectural Sketches from the Continent, 1858. On his return to London he moved to George Edmund Street's practice.

Practice

In 1863, after sixteen years of training, Shaw opened a practice for a short time with Nesfield. In 1872, he was elected an Associate of the Royal Academy.

Shaw worked for, among others, the artists John Callcott Horsley and George Henry Boughton, and the industrialist Lord Armstrong.  He designed large houses such as Cragside, Grim's Dyke, and Chigwell Hall, as well as a series of commercial buildings using a wide range of styles.

Shaw was elected to the Royal Academy in 1877, and co-edited (with Sir Thomas Jackson RA) the 1892 collection of essays, Architecture, a profession or an Art?. He firmly believed it was an art.  In later years, Shaw moved to a heavier classical style which influenced the emerging Edwardian Classicism of the early 20th century. Shaw died in London, where he had designed residential buildings in areas such as Pont Street, and public buildings such as New Scotland Yard.

Shaw's early country houses avoided Neo-Gothic and the academic styles, reviving vernacular materials like half timber and hanging tiles, with projecting gables and tall massive chimneys with "inglenooks" for warm seating. Shaw's houses soon attracted the misnomer the "Queen Anne style". As his skills developed, he dropped some of the mannered detailing, his buildings gained in dignity, and acquired an air of serenity and a quiet homely charm which were less conspicuous in his earlier works; half timber construction was more sparingly used, and finally disappeared entirely.

Family and later life
On 16 July 1867, Shaw married Agnes Haswell Wood at the parish church in Hampstead. She was the daughter of James Wood and was born in New South Wales, and most of the Wood siblings were sent to England for part of their education. All the children but Agnes returned to New South Wales and from there, most of the family moved to Christchurch in New Zealand. Agnes lived with an aunt in England and in 1866, she became engaged to Shaw. Her nephew, Cecil Wood (1878–1947), was gifted at drawing and Shaw's career is assumed to have been an influence in Cecil Wood becoming an architect.

In later life he lived at 6 Ellerdale Road, Hampstead, London. He died in London and is buried in St John-at-Hampstead Churchyard, Hampstead, London.

Bedford Park, London

One of Shaw's major commissions was the planning and designing of buildings for Bedford Park, London. Shaw was commissioned in 1877 by Jonathan T. Carr though his involvement only lasted until 1879. He designed St Michael and All Angels, Bedford Park, as the Anglican parish church for the development.

Built work

Gallery

See also
 The English House
 Richmond Plantation

References

Attribution

Sources
 T. Affleck Greeves, "Bedford Park the first garden suburb". Anne Bingley, 1975. .
 Andrew Saint, Richard Norman Shaw, revised edition, 2010..
 Hitchcock, Henry-Russell. Architecture: Nineteenth and Twentieth Centuries. 2nd ed. Baltimore: Penguin Books, 1963. 
 Jones, Edward, & Christopher Woodward. A Guide to the Architecture of London. 2nd ed. London: Weidenfeld & Nicolson, 1992  
 Norman Shaw's Letters: A Selection,  Architectural History, Vol. 18 (1975), pp. 60–85, Published by: SAHGB Publications Limited, DOI: 10.2307/1568382

External links

 Great Buildings on-line: Richard Norman Shaw
 Illustrations of Adcote
 Flickr photoset
 Archiseek: Richard Norman Shaw

19th-century British architects
1831 births
1912 deaths
Architects from Edinburgh
Royal Academicians
British ecclesiastical architects